The Blockheads is a survival sandbox independent video game created by David Frampton, an indie developer and owner of Majic Jungle Software, a studio based in New Zealand.

Gameplay
The Blockheads is a 2.5D survival sandbox game. Players control a customizable "Blockhead" avatar and can explore their surroundings, navigate the world map, harvest materials to create structures, and craft more advanced tools and materials in the game.

Aggressive and passive creatures exist on land, underground, and in bodies of water. These include sharks, dodos, scorpions, dropbears, and fellow Blockheads. The game features a player versus player option that enables players to attack one another in Multiplayer mode.

Multiplayer can be accessed over Wi-Fi, with worlds hosted over LAN, Game Center, or cloud servers hosted by Linode. Since version 1.7, servers are paid for with in-app purchases.

The game can also be hosted via an app for Mac users, although the availability of the world solely depends on the online status of the host. The player can 'warp' a Blockhead through a portal, randomly generating a finite world of multiple sizes ranging from 1/16-16x that loops back to the portal.

The Blockheads have five statistics: health, happiness, hunger, energy, and environment. They are easy to access from the in-game menu. The hunger and energy bars will constantly decrease (unless the Blockhead is wearing a specific hat) and the Blockhead must eat food to prevent the hunger bar from entirely depleting, which then will depletes the health bar. When the energy bar is depleted, the Blockhead will walk slower and 'collapse from exhaustion' (pass out). The energy bar can be gradually filled by sleeping in a bed or on the ground, or it can be filled instantly by consuming caffeinated items like coffee.

The player must craft items to progress in the game. Crafting takes a certain amount of time, but this waiting process can be bypassed by using time crystals, which can be gained by watching short advertisements, mining them in caves, or through in-app purchases. Players can also purchase double-time, a feature speeding up crafting times by twice the speed and cuts the time crystal costs in half.

The player can choose to join online servers and play with others. On an iOS device, the player can set up a Local Area Network LAN world. The game center option was disabled after version 1.7.

After version 1.7, players can create single player worlds or servers with custom options, such as custom health values, how the world is generated, custom sun colors, and even customizing the items Blockheads spawn with. Version 1.7 also included a new game mode called “expert mode.”

The Blockheads contains in-app purchases including the aforementioned double-time and time crystals, which can be used to craft items, make and/or support online servers, and do actions faster in the game. Players can also get time crystals through watching in-game advertisements. HD graphics used to be paid and added in hand drawn icons to the interface. With the 1.7 update, it was made free, but can be turned off in settings.

Reception
Rickey Ainsworth of TouchArcade said that it is another one of many two-dimensional versions of Minecraft, but features many twists and turns that make the game exciting. Metacritic, based on 7 reviews and 6 ratings, gives the game a 5/10 score.

Other 
The Blockheads has an official website and a forum run on Discourse and previously vBulletin. On March 10, 2022, it was announced that the forum would be permanently put into a read-only state, which occurred on April 11, 2022.

The game has received over 10 million official downloads. It has been noted that the game has largely been overrun by script kiddies, and a small portion of the player base has been overtaken by role-play, online dating, and sexual content.

In January 2021, the app was removed from the Google Play Store for unknown reasons (at the time). Its publisher (Noodlecake Studios) had yet to comment on what happened. The Blockheads Community Manager would later confirm that the game was removed from the Google Play Store by Noodlecake Studios themselves due to failed negotiations with Google to circumvent certain requirements of modern Android versions. As a result, it is highly unlikely that the app will ever return to the Google Play Store, but the APK file can still be downloaded from Noodlecake Studio's website.

On August 22, 2022, David Frampton announced that he would be shutting down the online services that hosted cloud servers due to "low player numbers" and a significant lack of maintenance. In his announcement, David Frampton clarified that players would have the ability to download their cloud worlds and also mentioned that the shutdown would take some time. Along with claiming that he had no plans to remove The Blockheads from the App Store, David Frampton also noted that Mac servers would not be affected by the shutdown.

References

External links
 
 Official forums
 Official Android APK
 The Blockheads Wiki

2013 video games
Android (operating system) games
IOS games
Multiplayer and single-player video games
Multiplayer video games
Noodlecake Games games
Open-world video games
Survival video games
Video games developed in New Zealand